Williamsoniaceae is a family within the Bennettitales, an extinct group of seed plants within the Cycadophyta subdivision. Members of this family are believed to have been around two meters tall and with widely serrate leaves along a central stem. Reproductive organs of the Williamsoniaceae have varied widely in the fossil record but almost all have been found to be borne on stalks emerging from a ring of leaves.

Reproduction
This family is different from Cycadeoidaceae by having the presence of cones leaving the major axis and lateral branches associated with a long peduncle covered by bracts. Some of this family reproduce by sporangia and others only produce ovule or pollen sacs.

References

Bennettitales
Triassic plants
Jurassic plants
Cretaceous plants
Prehistoric plant families
Triassic first appearances
Cretaceous extinctions